David Russell Wartinbee (November 11, 1903 – March 27, 1977) was an American, Republican politician and educator from Wisconsin.

Born in La Crosse, Wisconsin, Wartinbee received his degree in music from University of Wisconsin–Madison and his masters from University of Minnesota. He also went to what is now University of Wisconsin–La Crosse. He taught music and then history and social problems at La Crosse Central High School. He served in the Wisconsin State Assembly 1961–1967. He died in La Crosse in 1977

Notes

Politicians from La Crosse, Wisconsin
University of Wisconsin–Madison College of Letters and Science alumni
University of Minnesota alumni
Educators from Wisconsin
Republican Party members of the Wisconsin State Assembly
1903 births
1977 deaths
20th-century American politicians